This article presents a list of the historical events and publications of Australian literature during 1863.

Books 

 Maud Jeanne Franc – Vermont Vale : or Home Pictures in Australia
 Henry Kingsley – The Hillyers and the Burtons : A Story of Two Families

Short stories 

 J. R. Houlding
 "Jack Tars, Ahoy!"
 "Stone Blind"

Poetry 

 William a'Beckett – The Earl's Choice and Other Poems
 Emma Frances Anderson – "An Australian Girl's Farewell"
 Henry Kendall
 "By the Sea"
 "Mountain Moss"
 "Rest"
 "To my Brother, Basil E. Kendall"

Births 

A list, ordered by date of birth (and, if the date is either unspecified or repeated, ordered alphabetically by surname) of births in 1863 of Australian literary figures, authors of written works or literature-related individuals follows, including year of death.

 18 June – George Essex Evans, poet and writer (died 1909)

See also 
 1863 in Australia
 1863 in literature
1863 in poetry
 List of years in Australian literature
List of years in literature

References

 
Australia
19th-century Australian literature
Australian literature by year